H. Nagappa was a Janata Dal (United) political leader, two term member of the Karnataka Legislative Assembly and minister for agricultural marketing in the J. H. Patel cabinet.

He was abducted by forest brigand Veerappan and his gang members on 25 August 2002 from the Kamagere village of Chamarajanagar district. On 8 December 2002, Nagappa was killed by Veerappan or his gang members or by Tamil nadu police at Changadi forest area near M. M. Hills bordering the state of Tamil Nadu.who killed him is a mystery .

References 

Karnataka MLAs 1994–1999
Janata Dal (United) politicians
Assassinated Indian politicians
Year of birth missing
2002 deaths
2002 murders in India
Deaths by firearm in India
People murdered in Karnataka
Karnataka politicians